Hartmannswiller is a commune in the Haut-Rhin department in Alsace in north-eastern France.

It is situated between vineyards and orchards, at the foot of Hartmannswillerkopf (Vieil Armand). It is 6 km from Guebwiller, 14 km from Thann and 20 km from Mulhouse.

See also
 Communes of the Haut-Rhin département

References

Communes of Haut-Rhin